Live in Sweden 2004 is a live album by the American rock band Incubus, released in 2004. The album's  proceeds go to the band's charitable arm, the Make Yourself Foundation.

Track listing
Disc one
 "Megalomaniac" - 5:37
 "A Crow Left of the Murder" - 3:54
 "Warning" - 4:42
 "Idiot Box" - 4:31
 "Just a Phase" - 5:45
 "Priceless" - 4:46
 "Wish You Were Here" - 4:07
 "Pantomime" - 5:24
 "Here In My Room" - 4:35
 "Drive" - 4:39
Disc two
 "Pistola" - 4:28
 "Crowded Elevator" - 5:03
 "Vitamin" - 10:41
 "The Warmth" - 5:32
 "Talk Shows on Mute" - 4:02
 "A Certain Shade of Green" - 5:08
 "Sick Sad Little World" - 10:46
 "Bass Solo" - 4:57
 "Are You In?" - 3:32

Credits

Incubus
Brandon Boyd – vocals
Mike Einziger – guitar
Ben Kenney – bass
Chris Kilmore – turntables, keyboards, mellotron, marxophone
José Pasillas – drums, percussion

Incubus (band) albums
2004 live albums